Clive Edward Griffiths  (20 November 1928 – 8 November 2020) was an Australian politician.

Career
He was born in South Perth to mechanical fitter Thomas Edward Griffiths and Dorothy Margaret Beattie. In 1943 he was apprenticed to an electrical fitter at Kalgoorlie, and in 1947 worked for plant engineers at the Public Works Department. He developed his own business from 1953, and although he was a member of the Amalgamated Engineering Union, he joined the Liberal Party in 1956. He served on South Perth City Council from 1962 to 1966, and in 1965 was elected to the Western Australian Legislative Council representing South-East Metropolitan Province. He was elected President of the Council in 1977 and served for twenty years, the longest term of any parliamentary presiding officer in Western Australia. On his retirement from politics in 1997, he was appointed Agent-General for Western Australia, and was also given the Officer of the Order of Australia. Griffiths was also awarded the Centenary Medal in 2003.

References

1928 births
2020 deaths
Members of the Western Australian Legislative Council
Presidents of the Western Australian Legislative Council
Liberal Party of Australia members of the Parliament of Western Australia
Officers of the Order of Australia
Politicians from Perth, Western Australia
Western Australian local councillors